The Klamath County Event Center is a 2,800-seat multipurpose arena located in Klamath Falls, Oregon, as part of the Klamath County Fairgrounds.

The arena contains a 45,000-square-foot (150-by-300 feet) arena floor, allowing it to be used for multiple events, including rodeos, concerts, conventions and trade shows.  Adjacent to the arena seating a building housing two ticket booths, two concession stands, and a conference room.  The concrete exhibit area measures .

There are 2000 parking spaces in the fairgrounds.

External links
Klamath County Fairgrounds

 

Indoor arenas in Oregon
Convention centers in Oregon
Sports venues in Oregon
Buildings and structures in Klamath Falls, Oregon
Tourist attractions in Klamath County, Oregon